Mordellistena exclamationis is a beetle in the genus Mordellistena of the family Mordellidae. It was described in 1924 by Maurice Pic.

References

exclamationis
Beetles described in 1924